The men's 1500 metres at the 2019 World Para Athletics Championships was held in Dubai, United Arab Emirates in November 2019.

Medalists

T11

T13

T20

T38

T46

T52

T54

See also 
List of IPC world records in athletics

References 

1500 metres
2019 in men's athletics
1500 metres at the World Para Athletics Championships